Whale Cove Airport  is located  from Whale Cove, Nunavut, Canada, and is operated by the government of Nunavut.

Airlines and destinations

References

External links

Certified airports in the Kivalliq Region